Samuel Mukooza (born 4 December 1989) is an Ugandan retired basketball player. His last professional team was Trelleborg Basket of the Swedish Basketettan.

He represented Uganda's national basketball team at the 2015 AfroBasket, where he was his team's best passer.

References

External links
 FIBA.com profile
 ARCHIVE.FIBA.com profile
 REAL GM profile
 Eurobasket.com profile

1989 births
Living people
Jämtland Basket players
Shooting guards
Sportspeople from Kampala
Ugandan men's basketball players
Ugandan expatriate sportspeople in Sweden